Dendroleontini is a tribe in the antlion subfamily Dendroleontinae.

Genera 

 Acanthoplectron
 Afghanoleon
 Anomaloplectron
 Asialeon
 Austrogymnocnemia
 Bankisus
 Bullanga
 Compsoleon
 Csiroleon
 Cuca
 Cymathala
 Cymothales
 Delgadus
 Dendroleon
 Doblina
 Epacanthaclisis
 Froggattisca
 Fusoleon
 Gatzara
 Glenoleon
 Indoclystus
 Layachima
 Mossega
 Nannoleon
 Neleinus
 Nepsalus
 Nomes
 Omoleon
 Parvoleon
 Periclystus
 Phanoleon
 Platyleon
 Riekoleon
 Tricholeon

References

External links 

Myrmeleontidae
Insect tribes